Mohamed El Hankouri (born 1 July 1997) is a professional footballer who plays as a winger for 2. Bundesliga club 1. FC Magdeburg. Born in the Netherlands, El Hankouri is a youth international for Morocco.

Club career
El Hankouri rose through the Feyenoord youth ranks. He made his debut for Feyenoord on 27 August 2016 in an Eredivisie game against Excelsior Rotterdam. He came on as a substitute for Steven Berghuis in the 81st minute, in 4–1 home match win. On 16 January 2019, El Hankouri completed a move to FC Groningen going on loan for the remainder of the season first, after which he will sign a two-year contract for a permanent move.

In June 2022 German club 1. FC Magdeburg, newly promoted to the 2. Bundesliga, announced the singing of El Hankouri for the 2022–23 season.

International career
El Hankouri was born in the Netherlands and is of Moroccan descent. He represented the Netherlands U20s in a 1–1 friendly tie with the Netherlands U20s on 14 November 2016. He most recently represented the Morocco U23s in a 1–1 friendly tie with the Tunisia U23s on 9 September 2018, scoring his side's only goal.

Personal life
El Hankouri is the older brother of the Moroccan footballer Redouan El Hankouri.

Career statistics

Honours
Feyenoord
 Eredivisie: 2016–17
Johan Cruyff Shield: 2017, 2018

References

External links
 
 Ons Oranje Profile

1997 births
Living people
Dutch sportspeople of Moroccan descent
Moroccan footballers
Dutch footballers
Footballers from Rotterdam
Association football midfielders
Morocco youth international footballers
Netherlands youth international footballers
Eredivisie players
2. Bundesliga players
Feyenoord players
Willem II (football club) players
FC Groningen players
1. FC Magdeburg players
Moroccan expatriate footballers
Expatriate footballers in Germany
Moroccan expatriate sportspeople in Germany